Jorge Antonio "el Flaco" Vivaldo (born 18 February 1967 in Luján) is an Argentine former football goalkeeper and current manager of Club Atlético Villa San Carlos.

Career
Vivaldo played for several Argentine teams in his career such as Arsenal de Sarandí, Deportivo Español, Chacarita Juniors, Colón de Santa Fe, Tiro Federal and Independiente Rivadavia. His most important achievement was the promotion to the Argentine First Division with Colón de Santa Fe in 1995.

In 2004, he was close to signing with Boca Juniors under the request of then coach Carlos Bianchi but the deal fell through in a scandalous way when Vivaldo was being the guest of an Argentine football TV show. During the show, the host had a live communication with a board member of Boca Juniors who confirmed that the club was no longer interested in Vivaldo even after he had a verbal agreement with the coach.

Managerial career
In 2009 Vivaldo became manager of Club Atlético Temperley of the Primera B Metropolitana, he then stepped up a division to take over as manager of C.A.I. of the Primera B Nacional.

References

External links
 Jorge Vivaldo – Argentine Primera statistics at Fútbol XXI  
 Jorge Vivaldo at BDFA.com.ar 
 

1967 births
Living people
Sportspeople from Buenos Aires Province
Argentine footballers
Arsenal de Sarandí footballers
Deportivo Español footballers
Club Atlético Colón footballers
Chacarita Juniors footballers
Olimpo footballers
Tiro Federal footballers
Independiente Rivadavia footballers
Argentine football managers
Argentine expatriate football managers
Expatriate football managers in Uruguay
Expatriate football managers in Colombia
Comisión de Actividades Infantiles managers
Atlético Huila managers
Chacarita Juniors managers
Association football goalkeepers